Siokapesi Palu (born 15 October 1996) is an Australian rugby union player. She plays Centre for the Brumbies in the Super W competition.

Palu was selected in the Wallaroos 32-player squad to meet Fiji and Japan in two test matches, but she did not get to run onto the field. She started for the Australian Barbarians side against Japan at Wests Rugby Club in Brisbane on 6 May 2022.

Palu was named in the Australian national team for a two-test series against the Black Ferns for the O'Reilly Cup. She was named in the starting line-up in the second test against New Zealand and made her debut on 27 August 2022 in Adelaide. She was selected in the team again for the delayed 2022 Rugby World Cup in New Zealand.

References

External links
Wallaroos Profile

1996 births
Living people
Australia women's international rugby union players
Australian female rugby union players